Nikhil S. Praveen is an Indian cinematographer. The Kottayam native made his debut with the 2017 film Bhayanakam directed by Jayaraj for which he received Best Cinematography award at the 65th National Film Awards and again he received 2020 National Film Award in non - features category for the film shabdikunna kalapa

Filmography

Awards
2020 - National Film Award for Best cinematographer - shabdikunna kalapa
2018 - National Film Award for Best Cinematography - Bhayanakam
2018 - Kerala Film Critics Association Awards for Best cinematographer - Bhayanakam
2019 - Best Cinematographer at Beijing International Film Festival - Bhayanakam

References

External links

Malayalam film cinematographers
Living people
Cinematographers from Kerala
Best Cinematography National Film Award winners
1991 births